Rufat Bagirov (born October 10, 1979 Azerbaijan) was the Chess Champion of Azerbaijan in 1998 and Sub Champion of Azerbaijan in 2011. He got International Master (IM) title in 1998 and Grandmaster (GM) title in 2002. He was a member of the Azerbaijan Chess Olympiad team in 2000. 

He was the was awarded the title FIDE Trainer (2014).

Notable Tournaments

References 

1979 births
Living people
Azerbaijani chess players
Chess grandmasters